The Canadian National Electric Railways (CNER) was a subsidiary of the Canadian National Railways created to operate a few electric lines. It was formed in November 1923, with headquarters in Toronto.

Acquired lines
The CNER inherited the following lines or systems from the Canadian Northern Railway and unified them under one management:
 Niagara, St. Catharines and Toronto Railway - an interurban system operating on the Niagara Peninsula
 Toronto Suburban Railway - Guelph and Woodbridge lines only
 Toronto Eastern Railway - a line never completed

Associated lines
The CNER was closely associated with three railways which Canadian National Railways inherited from the Grand Trunk Railway. These railways never became a corporate part of the CNER:
 Oshawa Railway - a passenger and freight operation in Oshawa, Ontario
 Thousand Islands Railway - a shortline in Gananoque, Ontario - never electrified
 Montreal and Southern Counties Railway - an interurban between Montreal and Granby, Quebec with a branch to Longueuil

Radial network
With the creation of the CNER, CNR president Henry Thornton was enthusiastic to develop Canadian National's own network of electric railways. This followed setbacks that Adam Beck had in promoting an Ontario Hydro radial network with its subsidiary the Hydro-Electric Railways.

Thornton planned to link the unfinished Toronto Eastern Railway to the Toronto Suburban Railway's Guelph line via the Toronto Belt Line Railway running through northern Toronto. There was also another plan to extend the Guelph line from its "temporary" terminal at Keele Street and St. Clair Avenue to downtown via the nearby CNR line. The CNER's Toronto Suburban district never turned a profit, and its abandonment in 1931 was the result of huge deficits from that line.

See also

 Hydro-Electric Railways was another organization intended to promote radials in Ontario.
 Interurban
 List of defunct Canadian railways

References

External links
  on Trainweb.org

Canadian National Electric Railways
Canadian National Railway subsidiaries
Railway companies established in 1923
Interurban railways in Ontario
Electric railways in Canada